The 1961 World Table Tennis Championships women's singles was the 26th edition of the women's singles championship.
Chiu Chung-Hui defeated Éva Kóczián in the final by three sets to two, to win the title.

Results

See also
List of World Table Tennis Championships medalists

References

-
1961 in women's table tennis